Bazil Broketail (1992) is a fantasy novel written by Christopher Rowley. The book is the first in the Dragons of the Argonath series that follows the adventures of a human boy, Relkin, and his dragon, Bazil Broketail as they fight in the Argonath Legion’s 109th Marneri Dragons.

Relkin and Bazil, down on their luck when they come to the white city of Marneri, are obliged to join the Legions of the Argonath and find themselves fighting against the Masters of Padmasa, whose agent Thrembode the New has kidnapped the young Queen, Besita. They track the queen to the Masters’ stronghold of Tummuz Orgmeen where they encounter the Doom, a black rock imbued with an evil intelligence. All except Relkin are captured and forced to fight as gladiators against trolls and imps in the Masters’ arena. During a critical battle Relkin managed to return Bazil’s dragonsword to his partner, who cuts down and destroys the Doom, though his sword is destroyed in the process. Tummuz Orgmeen falls to the invading Argonath forces and Besita is rescued.

1992 American novels
Novels by Christopher Rowley
American fantasy novels
Roc Books books